Hoi Choi is a Bengali drama film directed by Debarati Gupta and produced by Dilip Choudhury. This film was released on 12 July 2013 under the banner of Ganapati Entertainments.

Plot
Struggling theatre actress Piyal become frustrated without getting recognition. She and her friends performs street theatre and decide to create a new group Hoi Choi. Two more performers, Aban and Nalok, join their group. Unpleasant truth reveals about the politics of group theatre.

Cast
Paoli Dam as Piyal
Rahul Banerjee as Aban
Priyanaka Sarkar as Tupur
Rudranil Ghosh
Vikram Chatterjee as Nalok
Shekhar Das as Charan

References

External links
 

2013 films
Indian drama films
Bengali-language Indian films
2010s Bengali-language films